Niki Marvin is an English film producer active since the 1980s.

Credits
A Nightmare on Elm Street 3: Dream Warriors (1987) (associate producer)
... aka A Nightmare On Elm Street Part III (USA: closing credits title) 
Buried Alive (1990/II) (TV) (producer)
Midnight Cabaret (1990) (producer)
Strays (1991) (TV) (producer)
The Shawshank Redemption (1994) (producer) Nominated for the Academy Award for Best Picture
Buried Alive II (1997) (TV) (executive producer)
Hope Springs Eternal: A Look Back at 'The Shawshank Redemption''' (2004) (V) .... HerselfShawshank: The Redeeming Feature'' (2001) (TV) .... Herself

References

External links

American film producers
Living people
Year of birth missing (living people)